Sarah Angelica Van Buren (née Singleton; February 13, 1818 – December 29, 1877) was an American heiress and the daughter-in-law of the eighth president of the United States, Martin Van Buren. She was married to the President's son, Abraham Van Buren II. She assumed the post of first lady because the president's wife, Hannah Van Buren, had died and he never remarried. She is the youngest woman ever to act as the White House hostess, assuming the role at the age of 20.

Early life
Sarah Angelica Singleton was born in Wedgefield, South Carolina, on February 13, 1818.  She was the fourth of six children born to Richard Singleton and his wife, Rebecca Travis Coles.

Angelica was educated at the Columbia Female Academy in South Carolina and Madame Grelaud's French School in Philadelphia for five years.  She was a popular student at Madame Grelaud's and the school gave her the opportunity to meet a more diverse group of people.

Marriage
In 1838, Angelica visited Washington, DC, with her sister.  Former First Lady Dolley Madison, a cousin of Angelica's mother Rebecca Travis Coles, decided to play matchmaker and introduced the Singleton girls to President Martin Van Buren's bachelor sons.  Eight months later, Angelica Singleton married Abraham Van Buren on November 27, 1838, on his 31st birthday in Wedgefield.  The marriage strengthened President Van Buren's ties to the Old South.

Following the wedding, Van Buren assumed the duties of hostess at the White House with great success.

In early 1839, the couple took an extended trip through England (where her aunt, Sally Coles Stevenson, and uncle, Andrew Stevenson, who was U.S. Minister the U.K., lived) and other European countries. The trip was a massive success and when Van Buren returned to Washington, she hoped to bring some European style to the White House.  Angelica and other honored female guests began standing on a dais in the Blue Room to greet guests at the beginning of White House functions.  Although the French Ambassador enjoyed the reception, Americans did not.  The dais was soon removed.

In March 1840, Angelica gave birth to the couple's first child, a daughter named Rebecca; the child died a few months later.  After leaving the White House, the couple had four sons; the survivors were:

 Singleton Van Buren (1841–1885)
 Martin Van Buren II (1844–1885)
 Travis Coles Van Buren (1848–1889)

Acting First Lady
Van Buren served as White House hostess after the death of her mother-in-law. She was effectively the acting first lady of the United States.

In the 1982 Siena College Research Institute asking historians to assess American first ladies, Van Buren and several other "acting" first ladies were included. The first ladies survey, which has been conducted periodically since, ranks first ladies according to a cumulative score on the independent criteria of their background, value to the country, intelligence, courage, accomplishments, integrity, leadership, being their own women, public image, and value to the president. In the 1982 survey, out of 42 first ladies and "acting" first ladies, Van Buren was assessed as the 36th most highly regarded among historians. Acting first ladies such as Van Buren have been excluded from subsequent iterations of this survey.

Post-Van Buren presidency
After Martin Van Buren was defeated for re-election in 1840, Angelica and her husband lived at the Van Buren home of Lindenwald, in Kinderhook, New York, wintering at her family home, Melrose House, in South Carolina. From 1848 until her death, she lived in New York City. Martin Van Buren died of asthma on July 24, 1862, at his home in Kinderhook, New York. He was 79 years old.

See also
 Singleton's Graveyard, her family's plantation cemetery near Wedgefield, South Carolina

References

External links
 Angelica Van Buren biography at American Presidents Blog
 Angelica Singleton Van Buren Collection at University of South Carolina

|-

19th-century American women
1818 births
1877 deaths
First ladies of the United States
High Hills of Santee
People from New York City
People from Sumter County, South Carolina
Angelica van Buren